William of Northall (or William of Northolt) was a mediaeval Bishop of Worcester.

William was a clerk of Theobald of Bec, Archbishop of Canterbury and of Richard of Dover, also Archbishop of Canterbury. He held a prebend in the diocese of London and was Archdeacon of Gloucester from 1177 or 1178.

William was elected to the see of Worcester about 25 May 1186 and consecrated on 21 September 1186. He died on 2 or 3 May 1190. His death was commemorated on 3 May.

Citations

References
 
 British History Online Archdeacon of Gloucester accessed on 3 November 2007
 British History Online Bishops of Worcester accessed on 3 November 2007
 

Bishops of Worcester
12th-century English Roman Catholic bishops
1190 deaths
Year of birth unknown